Aguilón is a municipality located in the province of Zaragoza, Aragon, Spain. According to the 2004 census (INE), the municipality has a population of 290 inhabitants.

There are ruins of ancient Iberian settlements located within Aguilón's municipal term. These are known as Cerro de San Pablo de Villanueva and Peña Foradada.

See also
Campo de Cariñena
List of municipalities in Zaragoza

References

External links 

Aguilón

Municipalities in the Province of Zaragoza